Richard "Dick" Drescher (born February 2, 1946) is a retired male track and field athlete from the United States. He competed in the men's discus throw during his career. Drescher set his personal best in the discus throw event (63.90 metres) at the Mt. SAC Relays in Walnut on  April 24, 1976.

References

External links 
 
 Richard Drescher at the University of Maryland Athletics Hall of Fame

1946 births
Living people
American male discus throwers
Athletes (track and field) at the 1971 Pan American Games
Pan American Games gold medalists for the United States
Pan American Games medalists in athletics (track and field)
Medalists at the 1971 Pan American Games